Shanghai is a 2010 American neo-noir political thriller film directed by Mikael Håfström, starring John Cusack and Gong Li. The film was released in China on June 17, 2010. The film had a limited release in the United States on October 2, 2015, to negative reviews and performed poorly at the box office.

Plot
In December 1941, just before the entry of the United States into World War II, an American agent from the Naval Intelligence Office (Cusack) arrives in Shanghai to find his friend Conner (Jeffrey Dean Morgan) was recently murdered. Determined to find out who killed Conner and why, he begins working at The Herald newspaper using the alias Paul Soames, a Nazi-sympathizer cover he used while stationed in Berlin. He meets Anthony Lan-Ting (Chow Yun-Fat), an influential crime lord, and Captain Tanaka (Ken Watanabe) at the German embassy in Shanghai, during an invitation-only event. He later befriends Anthony when he saves him during an attack on Japanese officers by the Chinese Resistance at a night club.

Paul realizes that Anthony's wife, Anna (Gong Li), organized the attack and is the leader of the resistance. He then decides to help her pass on messages. After finally meeting up with Conner's contact in the Japanese Consulate, Paul finds out that Conner had an affair with a Japanese girl named Sumiko (Rinko Kikuchi) and after searching her home, uncovers numerous photos, which Conner took, in a darkroom nearby. Some of the photos include Captain Tanaka, other Japanese officers and the aircraft carrier Kaga.

Unconvinced that Sumiko betrayed Conner, he determines to find her and get answers. After a few more encounters with Anna, Anthony, Captain Tanaka, and investigating an opium house, Paul realizes that Sumiko was Captain Tanaka's lover and was seduced by Conner to spy for him. Paul's cover is blown when Conner's contact is arrested, and Paul is interrogated by Captain Tanaka regarding the whereabouts of Sumiko, whose location he does not know. After being released, Anna takes Paul to a safe house where she has been hiding Sumiko, who is on the verge of death due to opium withdrawal and other illnesses.

Anthony gives Captain Tanaka the location of the safe house to save Anna from arrest; inside the safe house, Tanaka informs Paul that the Japanese fleet started attacking Pearl Harbor one hour earlier and that the invasion of Shanghai is also underway. Tanaka admits to killing Conner, but only out of jealousy as he found out about his affair with Sumiko. A distraught Tanaka then asks for Paul's help in administering drugs to ease Sumiko's death. After Sumiko dies, everyone prepares to leave, but Tanaka wants to question Anna which infuriates Anthony, causing him to gun down Tanaka's bodyguards and seriously wound Tanaka himself. Before he can kill Tanaka, Anthony is fatally wounded by a dying bodyguard.

Leaving behind a wounded Tanaka, Paul drives the Lan-Tings away through the burning streets of Shanghai and with his last words, Anthony asks Paul to get Anna out of Shanghai, which he agrees to. Before getting on a ship to leave the city, Paul and Anna encounter Tanaka once again, but Tanaka does not acknowledge them. It is revealed later that both Paul and Anna, at some point, returned to Shanghai.

Cast
John Cusack as Paul Soames
Gong Li as Anna Lan-Ting
Chow Yun-fat as Anthony Lan-Ting
Jeffrey Dean Morgan as Conner
Ken Watanabe as Captain Tanaka (Japanese: 陸軍大尉田中, Rikugun-Tai-i Tanaka)
Rinko Kikuchi as Sumiko
David Morse as Richard Astor
Franka Potente as Leni Müller
Hugh Bonneville as Ben Sanger
Andy On as Yum
Race Wong as Cabaret performer
Rosanne Wong as Cabaret performer
Gemma Chan as Shin Shin
Benedict Wong as Juso Kita
Christopher Buchholz as Karl Müller
Ronan Vibert as Mikey
Nicholas Rowe as Ralph
Don Tai as Lan-Ting's bodyguard (uncredited)
Dean Alexandrou as Distraught husband (uncredited)

Production
The film was originally intended to be shot on location in Shanghai. However, after the controversy resulting from the graphic sexual scenes in Ang Lee's film Lust, Caution, which had just been filmed in Shanghai and was set during the same period, The Weinstein Company's permits were revoked by the Chinese government in April 2008, after three months of pre-production work had been completed in Shanghai and only one week prior to the scheduled start of filming. Thus, the film crew had to relocate to the UK to film interiors and to Bangkok, Thailand, where an elaborate two-block set was built.

Reception
Shanghai received negative reviews. Review aggregator Rotten Tomatoes gives the film a 4% score, an average rating of 4.2/10, based on 23 reviews. The site's consensus states: "Shanghai is crippled by a weak story and fatally undermined by clunky direction, making for a period political drama that lacks all of its key components." On Metacritic, the film holds a score of 36 out of 100, sampled from 14 critics, signifying "generally unfavorable reviews".

References

External links
 

2010 films
2010s mystery films
2010s spy films
2010 thriller drama films
American political drama films
American political thriller films
American spy films
American thriller drama films
Films scored by Klaus Badelt
Films about death
Films directed by Mikael Håfström
Films produced by Barry Mendel
Films set in 1941
Films set in Shanghai
Films shot in Thailand
Films set in Thailand
Films shot in Bangkok
American neo-noir films
Phoenix Pictures films
Films with screenplays by Hossein Amini
Second Sino-Japanese War films
2010s political thriller films
2010s political drama films
2010 drama films
2010s English-language films
2010s American films